Qaraqaşlı may refer to:
Qaraqaşlı, Agsu, Azerbaijan
Qaraqaşlı, Imishli, Azerbaijan
Qaraqaşlı, Khachmaz, Azerbaijan
Qaraqaşlı, Neftchala, Azerbaijan
Qaraqaşlı, Sabirabad, Azerbaijan
Karakashly, Azerbaijan